USS Harrisburg may refer to the following ships and other vessels:

 , a civilian ocean liner that served in the United States Navy during World War I as the transport USS Harrisburg during World War I
 , a future 

United States Navy ship names